Çaşkent or Chashkent is a village in Mary Province, Turkmenistan. The population as of 2013 is 11 438.

References

Populated places in Mary Region